The Crete spiny mouse (Acomys minous) is a species of mouse endemic to Crete. It is characterized by the coarse, stiff hairs on its back and tail and a notably grayer coloration and more pointed face than other species of spiny mice. Its fur color varies from yellow to red, gray or brown on its face and back, with white fur on its underside.  It is a nocturnal forager, feeding mainly on grass blades and seeds, and builds only a very rudimentary nest.

The gestation is between five and six weeks, which is unusually long for a mouse. At birth, other females clean and assist the mother. The young are well developed with open eyes when they are born.

Its taxonomic position is uncertain (it may be a variant of the Cairo spiny mouse) leading the IUCN to consider it data deficient, but it is common within its range and even if a valid species it is not threatened.

References
 

Acomys
Rodents of Europe
Endemic fauna of Crete
Mammals described in 1906